James Anders (8 March 1928 – 2002) was an English professional footballer who played for St Helens Town, Preston North End, Brentford, Bradford City, Rochdale, Bradford Park Avenue (two spells), Accrington Stanley, Buxton and Tranmere Rovers.

His brother was fellow footballer Harry Anders.

References

External links

1928 births
2002 deaths
English footballers
St Helens Town A.F.C. players
Preston North End F.C. players
Brentford F.C. players
Bradford City A.F.C. players
Rochdale A.F.C. players
Bradford (Park Avenue) A.F.C. players
Accrington Stanley F.C. (1891) players
Buxton F.C. players
Tranmere Rovers F.C. players
Association football midfielders